The United States Air Force's 3rd Air Support Operations Group (3 ASOG) is a combat support unit located at Fort Hood, Texas. The 3 ASOG provides Tactical Command and Control of air power assets to the Joint Forces Air Component Commander and Joint Forces Land Component Commander for combat operations.

Mission 
The mission of the 3 ASOG is to train, deploy, and focus combat airpower and integrated weather operations for the Joint Force commander alongside III Corps or any supported land force commander, anytime, anywhere.

Subordinate organizations 
3rd Combat Weather Squadron
7th Air Support Operations Squadron (Fort Bliss, Texas; supports 1st Armored Division)
9th Air Support Operations Squadron (Fort Hood, Texas; provides Tactical Command and Control of air power assets to the Joint Forces Air Component Commander and Joint Forces Land Component Commander for combat operations
10th Air Support Operations Squadron(Fort Riley, Kansas; supports 1st Infantry Division)
11th Air Support Operations Squadron (inactivated 21 June 2018; absorbed into the 9 ASOS)
13th Air Support Operations Squadron (Fort Carson, Colorado; supports 4th Infantry Division)
712th Air Support Operations Squadron (Fort Hood, Texas; supports 3rd Armored Cavalry Regiment)(squadron inactivated and reflagged as the 803rd Operation Support Squadron on 28 September 2018)

References 

Air Support Operations 0003
Military units and formations established in 1971
Military units and formations in Texas